Stickney Township is one of 29 townships in Cook County, Illinois. As of the 2010 census, its population was 40,772, with approximately 71% of that total living in the city of Burbank (pop. 28,925).

Township offices are located at 5635 W. State Road in Burbank. Other municipalities in the township include Stickney (pop. 6,786) and Forest View (pop. 698), and the largely industrial eastern half of Bedford Park, as well as some small portions of Bridgeview. The unincorporated communities of Central Stickney and Nottingham Park are also within the township. Stickney Township's approximate borders are Pershing Road (39th Street) on the north, Cicero Avenue on the east, 87th Street on the south, and Harlem Avenue on the west, excepting those areas in the Chicago communities of Garfield Ridge and Clearing (which include Chicago Midway International Airport), but also including the area between Laramie and Cicero Avenues as far north as 35th Street, where Hawthorne Race Course is located. The Chicago Sanitary and Ship Canal, designated a National Historic District in 2011, passes through the northwest corner of the township.

Geography

Borders
Stickney Township is bordered on the north by Berwyn and Cicero townships, on the west by Lyons Township, and on the south by Worth Township. On the east, it is bordered by the Chicago communities of West Lawn and Ashburn, as well as portions of the Garfield Ridge and Clearing communities that separate Stickney Township's two regions. Stickney Township was originally part of Lake Township, until much of its area was annexed by the city of Chicago in 1889; afterward, the remaining area became part of Lyons Township until 1901.

Cities, towns, villages
 Chicago (small portions)
 Bedford Park (east three-quarters)
 Bridgeview
 Burbank
 Forest View
 Stickney

Unincorporated towns
 Central Stickney at 
 Glenn at 
 Nottingham Park (partially in Lyons Township)

What became the southwest projection of the city of Chicago was within this township geographically until the area was annexed.  However, small portions of the city consisting primarily of industrial districts bordered by the Stevenson Expressway to the north, 51st Street to the south and Central Avenue to the east is located in the north segment of this township.  A business park with a few properties platted to the City of Chicago are in the northeast corner in the south segment of the township as well.

Adjacent townships
 Berwyn Township (north)
 Cicero Township (north)
 Worth Township (south)
 Palos Township (southwest)
 Lyons Township (west)
 Riverside Township (northwest)

Cemeteries
The township contains Mount Auburn Memorial Cemetery.

Major highways
  Interstate 55
  Illinois Route 43
  Illinois Route 50

Airports and landing strips
 Rose Packing Company Heliport

Demographics

Education
Students south of I-55 (Stevenson Expressway) attend schools in Central Stickney School District 110 (Charles J. Sahs Elementary School) and Burbank School District 111, followed by Reavis High School. Students in the more lightly populated area north of I-55 attend schools in Lyons School District 103, then Morton West High School in Berwyn.

Politics
Since 1973, the township supervisor has been Louis Viverito of Burbank; he has also served as the township's Cook County Democratic committeeman from 1969 to February 2007, and as an Illinois state senator from 1995 to 2011.

Political districts
 Illinois's 3rd congressional district
 State House District 21
 State House District 22
 State House District 23
 State House District 31
 State Senate District 11
 State Senate District 12
 State Senate District 16

Notable person
Ralph A. Beezhold (1927-2007), Illinois state representative and businessman, lived in Stickney Township.

References
 
 United States Census Bureau 2007 TIGER/Line Shapefiles
 United States National Atlas

External links
 Stickney Township official website
 City-Data.com
 Illinois State Archives
 Township Officials of Illinois
  
 South Stickney Sanitary District - township history
 Stickney Public Health District
 Cook County official site

Townships in Cook County, Illinois
Populated places established in 1901
Townships in Illinois